Stargazing is the debut extended play by Norwegian DJ Kygo. It was released through Sony Music and Ultra Music on 22 September 2017.

Background
On 18 August 2017, Kygo debuted the title track at Jugendfest 2017, after which he posted two short clips of the performance to his Instagram Stories. On 1 September 2017, he performed the song with live vocals from Jesso at Encore Beach Club in Las Vegas. On 6 September 2017, Kygo revealed on Instagram that "new music coming very soon". He officially announced the EP's release date and revealed its accompanying artwork on 18 September 2017.

Critical reception
Kat Bein of Billboard opined that Kygo "uses chopped vocal samples and glistening synthetic piano to create a tropical melody" instead of "his usual steel drums", and that "the kick drum hits hard on every other count, pushing the tune forward on the dance floor in a laidback way" on the title track. Karlie Powell of Your EDM felt the title track "takes on a whole new audible meaning as the producer's newest track dives into the touchy, feely realm of dance music he's known for".

Track listing

Charts

Weekly charts

Year-end charts

Certifications

References

2017 debut EPs
Albums produced by Louis Bell
Kygo albums
Sony Music albums
Ultra Records albums